St. Martin De Porres High School is a Roman Catholic high school located in the city of Airdrie, Alberta. The Calgary Catholic School District serves as its administrative school board.

History
The school was originally built in 1998 with portables units on site.

The school's name and patron saint is St. Martin de Porres.

Academics
The school offers English Language Learning (ELL), French Immersion, and Extended French programs.

Athletics
The St Martin De Porres Kodiaks compete as a part of the Division III in the Calgary Senior High School Athletic Association. The school participates in sports such as badminton, basketball, football, senior cross country, soccer, swimming, and volleyball.

References

External links
St Martin de Porres High School Official Web Site
The Calgary Catholic School District Official Site
Alberta Schools' Athletic Association
Calgary Senior High School Athletic Association

High schools in Calgary
Catholic secondary schools in Alberta